The Jaguar XJR-10 is an IMSA GTP sports prototype race car, designed, developed, and built by TWR for Jaguar, with the aim of competing, from 1989, in the IMSA GT Championship. Jaguar XJR-10s competed until 1991, before Jaguar replaced it with the Jaguar XJR-16. The car debuted a new 3.0-liter twin-turbo V6 engine, which replaced the previous V12, and was later fitted to the Jaguar XJ220 as well.

Wins/Victories

300 km from Portland 1989 (Chassis 389)
2 Hours Del Mar 1989 (Chassis 389)
Lime Rock 150 1990 (Chassis 389)
300 km from Portland 1990 (Chassis 589)
2 Hours of West Palm Beach 1991 (Chassis 589)
2 Hours of Miami 1991 (Chassis 389)

Drivers
Raul Boesel
Martin Brundle
Price Cobb
Alain Ferté
David Jones
Jan Lammers
David Leslie
John Nielsen

References

External links

XJR-5
IMSA GTP cars
Rear mid-engine, rear-wheel-drive vehicles
24 Hours of Le Mans race cars
Sports prototypes